Special Delivery is an American anthology series on Nickelodeon, broadcast during weekend afternoons from 1980 until 1993, when the network's original programming output was deemed sufficient to discontinue the block. Special Delivery mainly carried a variety of productions for children purchased by Nickelodeon, including both live-action and animated programming. Much of this programming was made up of children-focused made-for-TV movies produced in Canada in the 1970s and 80s, short films originally made for the ABC Afterschool Special and CBS Schoolbreak Special anthology series, sports specials (often with the time purchased from Nickelodeon by the event's distributors), and some unsold television pilots adapted to an hour-long timeslot.

From 1987 to 1989, 16 Cinema, which aired specials targeted towards teenagers, aired an hour after Special Delivery on Sundays. Several half-hour Special Delivery episodes plus new specials aired on weekdays as Nickelodeon Lunch Break Theater (in the summer of 1992), Nick Jr. Lunchbreak Theater (from late 1992 to April 1993), and Nick Jr. Storytime (from April 1993 to June 1995).

Overview
Presentations on Special Delivery were varied in focus and origin. A May 1984 issue of Boys' Life referred to the programs shown on Special Delivery as "fill-in shows" compared to the rest of Nickelodeon's lineup. Most programs were aimed at family audiences, but in an attempt to emulate the success of sister network MTV, Nickelodeon occasionally aired rock-and-roll concerts as part of the block. The earliest known Special Delivery broadcast was a Rick Derringer concert aired in April 1980. According to a March 1983 interview with Nickelodeon's acquisitions manager Eileen Opatut, potential acquisitions for the series were tested in schools before being chosen to air.

Episodes

16 Cinema

Nickelodeon/Nick Jr. Lunchbreak Theater/Nick Jr. Storytime

See also
History of Nickelodeon

References

1980s American children's television series
1990s American children's television series
1980s American anthology television series
1990s American anthology television series
1980 American television series debuts
1993 American television series endings
1980s Nickelodeon original programming
1990s Nickelodeon original programming
English-language television shows